South Korea has a nationwide system of national highways, officially called as General national highways, distinct from the expressways. The Ministry of Land, Transport and Maritime Affairs and other government agencies administer the national highways.

List of national highways

Abolished national highways

Hypothetical national highways on the territory of DPR Korea in the case of reunification

See also 
 Highway systems of South Korea
 Expressways in South Korea
 Local highways of South Korea

References

 
Roads in South Korea